Women's Slalom World Cup 1987/1988

Final point standings
In Women's Slalom World Cup 1987/88 all results count. Every race saw a different winner.

External links
fis-ski.com

World Cup
FIS Alpine Ski World Cup slalom women's discipline titles